Disney stand alone programming TV blocks are block of Disney shows on non-Disney channels or TV stations around the world. Disney puts together stand alone TV block to reach those audiences that do not have access to cable or satellite.

By the end of March 2000, Disney was in 35 countries in three regions, Latin America, Europe and Asia-Pacific (13 countries) with 82 blocks with more than 9,000 hours total per year. The block were under various names: Disney Club, Disney’s FilmParade, Disneytime, Disney!, DisneyKid, Club Disney, Saturday Disney, Disney Adventures, Disney Animation Hour, Disney Fun Time, Good Morning Disney, Disney Hour, Disney Sandhya, Disney Toontown, Sunday Club Disney, I Love Disney, Disney Animation Time, Dragon Club (China).

Disney also had a series of channels and blocks called Jetix, originally called Fox Kids, acquired in the purchase of Fox Family Worldwide, now ABC Family Worldwide.

List of blocks
{| class="wikitable sortable"
|-
! Market !! block !! channel/network !! type !! length (hrs) !! premiered !! closed
|-
|colspan=7|

A
|-
| Argentina 
| Playhouse Disney
| an Artear channel 
| 
|
| 2007
|
|-
|rowspan=4| Australia 
|| Total Girl || 7Two 
|rowspan=2|  weekday mornings
|rowspan=2|  2.5 
|rowspan=2|   †
|rowspan=2|  
|-
| K-Zone
| 7mate
|-
| Saturday Disney
| Seven Network/7flix 
| Saturday
| 3
| 
| 
|-
| Playhouse Disney
| Seven Network
| weekly
| .5 
| 
|
|-
|colspan=7|

Brazil
|-
|rowspan=4|  Brazil
| Disney on TV (Disney en TV)
| TV Globo
|
|
| 
| 
|-
| Disney World (Mundo Disney)
|rowspan=3| SBT
|daily
|2
| 
|
|-
| Disney Movies (Cine Disney)
| 
| 
| 1980s
|
|-
| Success Screen (Tela de Sucessos)
| 
| 
| 1997
| 2004
|-
|colspan=7|

C
|-
| Canada
| The Disney Afternoon (DA)
| CITV-DT
| weekday
| 2/day
| 
|
|-
|Czech Republic
| Disney Club
|TV Nova
| weekly 
| 2
|2006
|
|-
|rowspan=4| 
China
| Disney Adventures 
| provincial broadcasters, free-to-air and cable 
|
|  
|
|
|-
|Disney Club
| 12 stations (8/1997)
|
|
| 1995
| 
|-
| Dragon Club ‡
| 80% of cable providers 
| daily
| 2/day
|  
|
|-
|  Panda Club ‡
| four of China's five regional broadcasters
| 3 blocks
| 2/block
|  
|
|-
|colspan=7|

D
|-
|Denmark
|
|DR 1
|weekly on Fridays
|1
|colspan=2 align=center| 25 October 1991 - 31 December 2022
|-
|colspan=7|

G–H
|-
|rowspan=8 | 
Germany
| unnamed (or unrevealed name)
| Kirch Media's ProSieben
| Sunday afternoon movie
|
|  2002
|
|-
|rowspan=2 | Disney Club 
| RTL
| Saturday and Sunday
| 
| 
| 2002
|-
| ProSieben
| Saturday
|
| 2002
|
|-
|rowspan=2 | Disney Filmparade
| RTL
|rowspan=2 |  movie 
|rowspan=2 | 
| 2000
| 2005
|-
| ProSiebenSat.1 Group channel
| 2005
|
|-
|rowspan=3| Disney Time
| RTL
|
|
|colspan=2 align=center | -2000-

|-
| ProSieben
|rowspan=2| Sunday
| 2
| 
|late December 2004
|-
| Kabel 1
| 3
| late December 2004
|
|-
|Hungary
| Disney Klub
| RTL Klub
|  Saturday morning
|  1
|  
|
|-
|colspan=7|

India
|-
| rowspan="11" | 
India
| Disney Time
| Star Plus
|
| 1
|colspan=2| -2005-
|-
| unnamed or unmentioned
| DD National
|
|
|colspan=2 align=center| -1994- 
|-
| unnamed or unmentioned 
| Zee TV's Alpha language channels, Marathi, Punjabi, Gujarati and Bengali
|
|
|  
|  ↑
|-
|Disney Fun Time
|DD Metro
|
|
|2000
|2001
|-
| Disney Jadoo
| DD National  (purchased time)
| Saturday 10am
| .5
| 
|
|-
|rowspan=2 | Good Morning Disney
| Zee TV
|rowspan=2 | morning
|rowspan=4 | 2
|
| 2000
|-
|Sony TV
| 2000
| 2002
|-
|rowspan=2 | Disney Hour
| Zee TV
|rowspan=2 | afternoon
|
| 2000
|-
|Sony TV
| 2000
| 2002
|-
| unmentioned 
| STAR Utsav
|
|
|colspan=2 align=center| -2005-
|-
|Disney Sandhya'''
| Eenadu TV
| daily Telugu dubbed
|
| 
|
|-
|colspan=7|

I–P
|-
| Italy 
| Disney Cinemagic
| Sky Cinema Family
| weekend movies
|
|
|-
| Japan
| Disney Time 
| Dlife
|
|
| 
|
|-
| Kazakhstan
| Disney Club 
|KTK
| weekly
|
|colspan=2 align=center | - 2006 (renewed) - 2014

|-
|rowspan=2| Mexico
|rowspan=2| Disney Club 
|rowspan=2| Azteca 7
|
|
| 1998 
| 2001
|-
| new format
|
| 2001
| 2016
|-
| New Zealand
| Disney Club
| TVNZ
|
| 
| 
|
|-
| Philippines
| Disney Club
| TV5
|
|
| 
|-
|colspan=8|

R–T
|-
| Romania
| Disney Club
| RTV
|
|
|
|
|-
| Spain
| Club Disney
| Telecinco
|
|
|colspan=2 align=center| -1991-2008
|-
|rowspan=4| Thailand
|rowspan=4| Disney Club
|rowspan=4| BBTV
|rowspan=3| Saturday
| 1
| 
| 2002
|-
| 1.5
| 2002
| 2006
|-
| 100-minute
| 2006
| 2018
|-
|weekend
| 35-minute
| 2018
|
|-
|colspan=7|

U–V
|-
| UAE
| Disney Club
|Dubai TV
| daily
| .5; Thu. & Fri. 1
| 2006
|
|-
|rowspan=3|
United Kingdom
| Diggin’ It  ↔
| GMTV
|
|
|
|  
|-
| Playhouse Disney
| ABC1
| weekday mornings
| 1.5
|  Summer
| 
|-
|Saturday Disney
| GMTV
|
|
| 
| 
|-
|rowspan=6| USA
| ABC Kids (formerly Disney's One Saturday Morning)
| ABC 
| Saturday morning 
| 2
|September 13, 1997
|August 27, 2011
|-
| The Disney Afternoon (DA)
| syndication
| weekday afternoons
| 2/day
| 
| 
|-
| Disney-Kellogg Alliance, unbranded (DKA; formerly DA)
| syndication
| weekday afternoons
| 1.5/day
| 
| 
|-
| Disney's One Too (formerly DKA)
| UPN & syndication
| Sunday mornings & weekdays 
| 2/day
|  
|  
|-
| That's So Throwback
| Freeform
| Monday-Thursday late night
| 2
| 
| 
|-
| Treasures from the Disney Vault
| TCM
| quarterly classics
| ~9
| 
| 
|-
|Vietnam 
| Toon Disney
| HCMC TV
|
|
|  
|
|}

Notes
†Seven launched two weekday blocks (from 6:30am–9:00am) with mostly Disney programming on March 5, 2012 named after and aligned with affiliated Pacific Magazines's two tween magazines:
† Total Girl: is a girl focused block on 7Two with launch programs of Hannah Montana, Wizards of Waverly Place, Jonas LA, Sonny With a Chance, Good Luck Charlie, Shake it Up and The Fairies.
† K-Zone is a boy aimed block on 7mate with launch programs of Handy Manny, Stitch!, Kick Buttowski, Phineas and Ferb, Pair of Kings, Zeke and Luther and I'm in the Band''.
‡These two Chinese clubs found by ABC and DIC Entertainment before Disney's purchase of CC/ABC.
↔ This block had a companion website, www.diggit.co.uk, created in 2000 that allowed for personalization and creation of a "Dink", a custom virtual character.
↑under a one-year revenue-sharing agreement with Zee marketing the block and guaranteeing a minimum revenue to Disney.

References

Disney animated television series
Television syndication packages

Disney TV